HD 164509 is a binary star system composed of two main sequence stars in the constellation of Ophiuchus.

Star characteristics
HD 164509 primary star is a yellow main sequence star of spectral class G2, similar to the Sun. It is young and metal rich, having heavy elements abundance 160% of solar. Initially it was thought the system to comprise a single G5 class star, but in 2016 it was discovered the G2 primary is accompanied by the M-class red dwarf star at projected separation of 36.5 AU. The evidence for the stellar companion being on bound orbit was further fortified in 2017.

Planetary system 

In 2011, a Hot Jupiter class planet HD 164509 b was discovered around primary of HD 164509 using the radial velocity method. The planet HD 164509 b is impossible to form on the currently unstable in long term orbit, and may be a captured object formed elsewhere.

References 

Planetary systems with one confirmed planet
Ophiuchus (constellation)
G-type main-sequence stars
M-type main-sequence stars
Binary stars
88268
164509